Reyhan Shahr (also Romanized as Reyhanshahr; formerly, Bab Tangol (Persian: باب تنگل), also Romanized as Bāb Tangol, Bab Tankal, Bab-Tanqal, and Bāb Tangal; also known as Dungal and Eslamabad) is a city in the Central District of Zarand County, Kerman Province, Iran.  At the 2006 census, its population was 4,360, in 949 families.

References

Populated places in Zarand County

Cities in Kerman Province